The Gas Creek School, near Nathrop, Colorado in Chaffee County, Colorado, was built in 1909.  It was the only school in Chaffee County School District No. 20 and it operated from 1909 to 1958.  It was listed on the National Register of Historic Places in 2018.

It is a one-story brick school building, in open land with the  Mt. Princeton standing behind. It was built as a replacement for a wood-frame schoolhouse that was built in 1890. It has a hipped roof and a square bell tower holding a bell which is rung by pulling on a rope. It was a one-teacher one-room school, although it has two front doors.

A photo of the school is included in "America’s Country Schools", a 1996 book by Andrew Gulliford, who stated: "'Built from a plan book, this school has double entrances with canopies and an ornate bell tower.'" He suggested the school's symmetrical design indicated it may have been taken from a plan book.  He also noted that having a belfry or bell tower "usually placed above the entrance to the schoolhouse, had become a status symbol for many school districts' by the nineteenth century."

One teacher at the school was Betty Farrington, who taught fourteen students there during 1938-39 for a salary of $75 per month;  there was at least one student in each grade from one to eight.

The property also includes two privies, a shed, a swing set and a seesaw.

The 1875 Frantz Ditch runs through its property.

It was deemed significant as "an exceptionally well-preserved example of a one-room rural schoolhouse", and is unusual for being built of brick.

References

One-room schoolhouses in Colorado
National Register of Historic Places in Chaffee County, Colorado
School buildings completed in 1911
Schools in Chaffee County, Colorado
School buildings on the National Register of Historic Places in Colorado